Margaret Helen Waterfield, b. 1863, d. 1953 (aged 89), was an English artist best known for her watercolor paintings of flowers and other plants. She became a member of the Society of Women Artists in 1899 and lived in Canterbury, Kent, for several years. Her work has been displayed in the Royal Birmingham Society of Artists Gallery and the Walker Art Gallery in Liverpool.

Origin and Residency 

In 1863, Margaret was born in Shanklin, England and was one of seven children. Margaret lived with her mother and sister in Nackington, where she spent most of her time managing the garden and utilizing it as an outdoor studio for her paintings. Soon afterward, her talents were recognized and she began exhibiting her work throughout the country before being elected an Institute of Watercolor Artist associate. She then traveled extensively around Europe, visiting Italy, Switzerland, Austria, Algeria, and across the Mediterranean. When her younger brother, Aubrey Waterfield, married Lina Duff Gordon, Margaret resided in their castle at Aula near Florence, where she painted the Tuscan scenery. Nevertheless, Nackington is where she lived for most of her life until 1914, when she became preoccupied with World War I women's activities, resulting in disrepair as the house turned into a military hospital. Nackington was demolished soon afterward and the site was redeveloped for housing. By 1918, she started hunting for land on which to build her own home and had found it adjacent to Port Lympne with a view of Romney Marsh. Margaret moved to Aldersgate Wood at the age of 57 in 1921 and created a garden that would serve as her residence for the remainder of her life.

Artwork and Compositions 

Margaret's first book, "Garden Colour," followed a layout of having a chapter for most months- except for November, December, and January- which she wrote herself. A well-known garden author wrote an introductory chapter for each season. Theresa Earle covered spring, Summer by Eleanor Vere Boyle, Autumn by Rose Kinsley (daughter of Charles Kingsley), and Vicary Gibbs wrapped things up with color in the winter garden. There were three more chapters on roses and peonies written by different authors. Margaret herself illustrated all the pictures.

The cottage garden style mainly inspired the subjects of Margaret's illustration. Most illustrations were created from life in her garden at Nackington, while another group was created at Wisely. Still, others were created randomly in different gardens. None of the book's illustrations resemble a typical little cottage garden. However, they exhibit signs of planting in a naturalistic manner that also mixed in exotics. It is reflected by the text, where it is clear that she is fond of gentle disarray and talks of splendid plans for naturalizing. 

One of the paintings that capture Nackington as what she refers to as "a great Edwardian set-piece" is the frontispiece of “Garden Color”. It displays red-hot pokers, asters, and clematis in front of the elaborate gate leading to the walled kitchen garden. According to Diana Baskervyle-Glegg, the interior landscaping has over 100 fruit trees, including fan-trained peaches, a pear walk, and an orangery. Flowers lined the paths, and vines covered the arches. Other pictures depict considerably more extensive gardens or even landscaped settings that are sketched and colored to create a general impression rather than accurately depict a particular detail.
While there are no in-depth botanical studies, she also includes studies of small clusters of easily recognized flowers in their environment that are nonetheless depicted in sketchy styles. The text and paintings also help show complex gardening style changes. "Flower Grouping in English, Scotch, and Irish Gardens", which credited her as the author of the notes and come chapters and no fewer than 56 colorful pictures, resulted from a similar collaborative effort two years later. Along with Rose Kingsley and Eleanor Vere Boyle, there are 11 further authors.

Margaret demonstrated a strong passion and extensive understanding of all these species by writing various essays about diverse spring bulbs, flowering trees, rhododendrons, and bell flowers. Her natural tone and writing style, which lacks the poetic language used by many other writers of her time, make it simple to read yet challenging to select a quote to dictate the idea.

Most of her paintings in "Flower Grouping" are still in the same loose, sketchy manner as those in "Garden Colour," but some have a more distinct, crisp, but still far from sharp, feel. Diana Baskervyle-Glegg claims that her paintings of the Tregothnan garden are likely the first to document the flowering of new Chinese-imported shrubs, including rhododendrons and other shrubs. However, there is no textual evidence to support the claim. 

Margaret was an artist with Beatrice Parsons and Eleanor Fortescue-Brickdale, who contributed illustrations to Horace J. Wright and Walter P. Wright's "Beautiful Flowers and How to Grow Them." The book came out in two volumes in 1908 and 1909 and was re-issued in 1922. 

It was similar in style with ten writers, some of who were long dead this time, including poet William Cowper, John Ruskin, and Walter Scott. The poet and suffragist Alice Meynell and her former colleague Eleanor Vere Boyle, whose garden she featured as the front piece, both have excerpts in the book. As in "Corners of Grey Old Gardens," which was released in 1914, she again provided all of the pictures, giving the impression that she used the texts as a justification or backdrop for her paintings. 
The little book was beautifully produced and Jessie M. King, a modern Scottish artist with a recognizable aesthetic, created the cover. Again, it contained a number of set pieces by other authors, demonstrating the breadth of her knowledge of garden history and writing. John Gerard, Uvedale Price, William Lawson (priest), and Walter Scott all have excerpts. Eleanor Vere Boyle was among the more contemporary contributors once more.

Aldersgate Wood kept her busy and returned to publication in 1926. Nevertheless, it contributed four plates to accompany a new edition of Rev. Nathaniel Paterson's "The Manse Garden," which was first published in 1836, ninety years earlier. She continued to paint and plant after that, but her work was never again published or exhibited.

One hundred of Margaret's paintings were decaying away in a shed when her niece acquired Aldersgate Wood after her death in 1953. The paintings were beyond repair. Fortunately, some survived in private buyers' possession and through her novels.

The artist’s first piece to be offered at an auction was “Magnolia Conspicua- The Garden House at Saltwell” at The Canterbury Auction Galleries in 2016.

Bibliography

Written by Waterfield 

 Garden Colour (1905) with Vicary Gibbs, Mrs. C.W. Earle
 Flower Grouping in English Scotch & Irish Gardens (1907)

Illustrated by Waterfield 

 Beautiful Flowers and How to Grow Them by Horace J. Wright and Walter P. Wright (1922, co-illustrator)

References 

Artists from Kent
People from Canterbury
English watercolourists
20th-century English women artists
19th-century English women artists
Society of Women Artists members
Women watercolorists
20th-century English painters
19th-century English painters